The McLaren P1 is a limited-production mid-engine plug-in hybrid sports car produced by British automobile manufacturer McLaren Automotive. Debuted at the 2012 Paris Motor Show, sales of the P1 began in the United Kingdom in October 2013 and all 375 units were sold out by November. Production ended in early December 2015. The United States accounted for 34% of the units and Europe for 26%.

It is considered by the automotive press to be the successor to the McLaren F1, utilising hybrid power and Formula One technology, but does not have the same three-seat layout. It was later confirmed that the Speedtail served as the actual successor to the McLaren F1. The P1 has a mid-engine, rear wheel drive design that used a carbon fibre monocoque and roof structure safety cage concept called MonoCage, which is a development of the MonoCell first used in the MP4-12C and then in subsequent models. Its main competitors are the LaFerrari and the 918 Spyder. They are all similar in specifications and performance, and in a race around Silverstone circuit they were all within half a second of each other, the P1 finishing first at 58.24 seconds and the LaFerrari finishing last at 58.58 seconds; the 918 was in-between with 58.46 seconds.

Parts of the car were inspired by a sailfish that Frank Stephenson saw when on holiday in Miami.

58 units of the track-oriented P1 GTR and 5 units of its road legal counterpart, the P1 LM were produced after the initial run of 375 cars.

13 experimental prototypes 'XP', 5 validation prototypes 'VP', and 3 pre-production 'PP' cars were produced by McLaren before the production of the P1 started. A number of these 21 test cars have been refurbished, modified and sold to customers.

Specifications 

The P1 features a  twin-turbocharged V8 engine. The electric motor can be deployed manually by the driver or left in automatic mode, whereby the car's ECUs 'torque fill' the gaps in the petrol engine's output, which is considered turbo lag. This gives the powertrain an effective powerband of almost 7,000 rpm. The car has rear-wheel-drive layout and is equipped with a 7-speed dual-clutch transmission developed by Graziano Trasmissioni.

Power for the electric motor is stored in a 324-cell lithium-ion high-density battery pack located behind the cabin, developed by Johnson Matthey Battery Systems. The battery can be charged by the engine or through a plug-in equipment and can be fully charged in two hours. The car can be operated using either the petrol engine, the electric motor or with a combination of the two. The P1 has an all-electric range of at least  on the combined European drive cycle. During EV mode the P1 has a petrol consumption of 4.8g/100 mile, and as a result, EPA's all-electric range is rated as zero. The P1 combined fuel economy in EV mode was rated by the EPA at 18 MPGe (13 L petrol equivalent/100 km; 22 mpg-imp petrol equivalent), with an energy consumption of 25 kW-hrs/100 mi and petrol consumption of 4.8 gal-US/100 mi.

The P1 has Formula 1 derived features such as the Instant Power Assist System (IPAS), which gives an instant boost in acceleration via the electric motor, a Drag Reduction System (DRS) which operates the car's rear wing, thereby increasing straight line speed, and a KERS. Both of these features (IPAS, DRS) are operated via two buttons on the steering wheel.

In electric only mode 0-60 mph in 10 seconds. The P1 also features bespoke Pirelli P-Zero Corsa tyres and specially developed carbon-ceramic rotor, caliper and brake pads from Akebono. From , it will cover 30.2 metres.

Production and sales 
The production version of the McLaren P1 was unveiled at the 2013 Geneva Motor Show. Production was strictly limited to 375 units which, according to McLaren, is to maintain exclusivity. 

In August 2013 McLaren announced that the production allocation destined to the Americas, Asia-Pacific and the Middle East was sold out. The cars destined for Europe were sold out by mid November 2013. The United States accounted for 34% of the limited production run, and Europe for 26%.

After some delays, production began in October 2013. Hand-assembled by a team of 61 engineers, at a production rate of one car per day McLaren production was planned for fifty cars by the end of 2013. The first delivery to a retail customer took place at the company's headquarters in Woking, England, in October 2013, with 12 units manufactured by mid November 2013. The first P1 delivery in the U.S. occurred in May 2014. The production run ended in December 2015.

According to JATO Dynamics, only twenty units had been registered worldwide during the first nine months of 2014. A total of 12 P1s were registered in Switzerland during 2014, and an additional five units between January and August 2015. About 59 units were delivered in the U.S. in 2014, and sales in the American market totalled about 127 units delivered through December 2015.

As of 2022, the following are the approximate number of McLaren P1s (all variants) in the most-popular countries among purchasers:

United States: 128 cars

United Kingdom: 73 cars (includes factory-owned "demo" and prototype cars)

China: 73 cars

United Arab Emirates: 29 cars

Germany: 25 cars

Japan: 17 cars

Switzerland: 15 cars

Canada: 12 cars

Bahrain: 8 cars

Monaco: 8 cars

Sweden: 7 cars

Recalls
On 11 December 2015, the NHTSA issued a recall for 132 McLaren P1 cars manufactured 1 March 2013, to 31 October 2015 since the bonnet might open while driving.

Variants

P1 GTR (2015–2016)

Celebrating 20 years since their victory in the 1995 24 Hours of Le Mans, McLaren announced that they would resurrect the GTR name by launching a track-only version of the P1, the P1 GTR.

The P1 GTR was initially only available to P1 owners. The concept car made its debut at the 2014 Pebble Beach Concours d'Elegance in August 2014. The P1 GTR production model was officially unveiled at the 2015 Geneva Motor Show. This price includes a worldwide owners track day series; later cars were offered for less money, for those P1 owners who had no interest in the track series but still wanted to purchase the GTR variant. In total 58 cars were made.

The P1 GTR went into production in 2015, after all the 375 standard P1s had been built, as a homage to its race-winning ancestor, the McLaren F1 GTR and were built, maintained and run by McLaren Special Operations.

Performance figures remain unconfirmed. The car also featured slick tyres, and had greater levels of performance, grip, aerodynamics and downforce in comparison to the road car. Featuring a new fixed ride height on race-prepared suspension, a fixed rear wing capable of using DRS, and a new exclusively designed exhaust made of titanium and inconel. Due to its fixed rear wing, the GTR generates 10% more downforce than the road legal P1.

In late 2015, historic racing team and McLaren F1 specialists Lanzante started undergoing road conversions of P1 GTRs for owners who wanted to drive their cars on the road. Thus far, 27 P1 GTRs have been converted for road use by Lanzante. The road legal version of the P1 GTR has a claimed top speed of 225 mph and a 0-60 mph time of 2.4 seconds.

To celebrate 40 years since James Hunt won the Formula 1 Driver’s Championship, McLaren has decided to dress up a P1 GTR in a special livery set to be showcased at the Goodwood Festival of Speed. The track machine is going to wear a body finish inspired by Hunt’s race helmet, with a black base color combined with red, yellow and blue stripes based on his Wellington College colors. The car is going to be driven over the weekend by none other than Bruno Senna, the official McLaren P1 GTR Driver Program Mentor.

P1 by MSO (2016-)
It is a limited version of P1 with hand-laid carbon fibre body in Lio Blue tinted lacquer, gloss black wheels, retrim of the interior with carbon black Alcantara and contrasting blue stitching, a 24-carat gold exhaust heatshield.

The vehicle was unveiled in 2016 Geneva Motor Show.

P1 LM (2016–2017)

With the production run of the P1 GTR complete, and prompted by their efforts in converting track-only P1 GTRs to road-legal specification, Lanzante Motorsport commissioned McLaren Special Operations' Bespoke division to build a further total of 6 new P1 GTRs for them to develop into road-legal P1 LM variants. Of this production run, five P1 LMs were sold and the sixth, the prototype P1 LM codenamed 'XP1 LM', was retained and is now being used for development and testing of future models. In order to convert the cars into the P1 LM specification, Lanzante Motorsport made changes to the drivetrain hardware (to increase power output), employed a modified rear wing and larger front splitter along with dive planes (to improve downforce), removed the air-jack system and installed Inconel catalytic converter pipes and exhaust headers, lightweight fabricated charge coolers, Lexan windows, lighter seats (similar to those used in the F1 GTR) and a titanium exhaust system, bolts and fixings (to save weight).

The tyre specifications are 275/30/19 for the front tyres and 335/30/20 for the rear tyres.

At the 2016 Goodwood Festival of Speed, the prototype P1 LM, 'XP1 LM', set the fastest ever time for a road car up the Goodwood hillclimb, with a time of 47.07 seconds, driven by Kenny Bräck.

On 27 April 2017, the prototype P1 LM, XP1 LM, continued its success on track, beating the road car lap record time at the Nürburgring Nordschleife, with a time of 6:43.22 using road legal Pirelli P Zero Trofeo R tyres but without a front number plate required for a car to be road legal. This lap time was once again set by Kenny Bräck, and announced on 26 May 2017.

P1 GTR-18 (2018)
In April 2020, Lanzante Motorsport revealed that it would do six more road legal conversions of the P1 GTR. This conversion uses the same Longtail bodywork found on the one-off P1 GT as well as a modified rear wing, a larger front splitter, and louvers for an increase in downforce. P1 GTR-18 chassis #1 (GTR chassis #11) is painted in the ‘Gulf Team Davidoff’ no. 028R livery with its wheels finished in no. 028R’s trademark orange shade.

P1 Spider (2022)
In June 2022 at the Goodwood Festival of Speed, Lanzante unveiled the P1 Spider. The company is offering 5 conversions to the open-top P1 for €2.4m.

One-off specials

P1 GT (2018)

At the 2018 Goodwood Festival of Speed, Lanzante Motorsport, who had previously modified McLaren P1 GTRs to road legal specifications and developed the P1 LM, introduced a new special based on the P1 GTR. The new car, called the P1 GT, was commissioned by two different McLaren VIP customers; one from the United Arab Emirates and one from Japan. Only two were built. The P1 GT is inspired by the McLaren F1 GT homologation special from the 1990s, including more aggressive bodywork than the standard car. Exterior modifications include a longer rear section, a larger rear wing, a longer front splitter, vented front fenders, removal of front canards, quad exhaust system in place of the original dual outlet design and a modified rear diffuser. The interior features fixed sports seats and Alcantara upholstery in tan and green colour along with a racing steering wheel and carbon fibre bits while the exterior features Silverstone green bodywork paying homage to the original homologation special. Powertrain modifications and performance figures remain unknown but are likely to have been increased as compared to the standard car owing to the extensive modifications.

P1 GTR by McLaren Special Operations (2018)
Also called 'Beco', it is a bespoke version of McLaren P1 GTR commemorating 30th anniversary of Ayrton Senna securing his first Formula 1 World Championship. It includes a tailwing inspired by the McLaren-Honda MP4/4 race car, Marlboro liveries.

Lap records 
However, the P1 LM, which wasn't road legal during the run, beat the road car's record time at the Nordschleife with a time of 6:43.22.

Gallery

Marketing
Mattel's Hot Wheels 1:64 die-cast P1 model car in Volcano Orange and Supernova Silver body, Lego Speed Champions series Volcano Yellow McLaren P1 model kit, Scalextric Volcano Yellow and Volcano Orange P1 slot car, Maisto radio-controlled 1:14 scale McLaren P1, Minichamps and Tecnomodel 1:43 P1 model car, Amalgam Fine Model Cars 1:8 scale McLaren P1 went on sale in 2015.

As part of McLaren Automotive's development of a pure electric vehicle for its Ultimate Series, a miniature version of electric ride on McLaren P1 in Volcano Yellow body colour went on sale at the end of October 2016 at selected McLaren Automotive retailers, followed by recognised global toy retailers.

See also
 List of production cars by power output
 Plug-in electric vehicle
 Plug-in electric vehicles in the United Kingdom
 Government incentives for plug-in electric vehicles
 List of modern production plug-in electric vehicles

References

External links

McLaren page: P1, P1 GTR
Press kit: P1
Video
2014 McLaren P1 at Jay Leno's Garage

P1
Rear mid-engine, rear-wheel-drive vehicles
Plug-in hybrid vehicles
Coupés
Sports cars
Cars introduced in 2013
Flagship vehicles